The  is a diesel multiple unit that has been operated on express services since 1980 under Japan National Railways and later under JR Hokkaido and JR Kyushu. Some variants were eventually built, including resort trains (the KiHa 183-5000 Niseko Express, the KiHa 183-5100 Crystal Express Tomamu & Sahoro, and the KiHa 183-5200 North Rainbow Express).

Whilst most sets were refurbished and remain in service, some cars were also withdrawn from service – of those, three cars (two KiHa 183-200 cars and one KiHa 183-5000 Niseko Express car) had their restoration crowdfunded and are stored in locations around Hokkaido, 17 cars were donated to the State Railway of Thailand, and the rest were scrapped. A further 19 cars were donated to Myanmar Railways for use on the Mandalay-Nay Pyi Taw route and services using these cars ran from 2009 until 2012, when they were withdrawn. 

The sets remaining in service on Hokkaido are to be withdrawn ahead of JR Hokkaido's 18 March 2023 timetable revision.

History 

After finishing development in 1979, the 183 series went through a year and a half of testing, before entering service in 1981.

In 1986, the 500/1500 variant was introduced, replacing the KiHa 80 series trains completely; in 1988, new owner JR Hokkaido would introduce the 550/1550 variant, which was used on limited express services.

In 2008, 19 KiHa 183 diesel cars were transferred to Myanmar Railways for donation which they are supposed to be scrapped but instead, JR Kyushu managed to recondition these units for shipment to overseas for commercial use in Yangon, Myanmar. Operations started in 2009 on the Mandalay-Nay Pyi Taw route and ran until 2012, when Myanmar Railways discontinued the use of the KiHa 183 series.

In September 2021, it was announced that 17 cars would be donated by JR Hokkaido to the State Railway of Thailand, with them bearing the shipping costs.

In July 2022, JR Hokkaido announced plans to withdraw the KiHa 183 series from Okhotsk and Taisetsu limited-express services on the Sekihoku Main Line during the fiscal year; these services are expected to be taken over by newer KiHa 283 series trains. On 16 December 2022, JR Hokkaido finalized the date of withdrawal of the KiHa 183 series, announcing that they would be withdrawn ahead of JR Hokkaido's 18 March 2023 timetable revision.

Manufactured cars

Prototype cars (183-900 series) 
In 1979, 12 prototype cars were manufactured, which were numbered the -900 series. They were intended to be in sets made up of 7 cars, which could be extended to 10 cars for long-distance services. All cars were eventually modified to be included in production sets; they were eventually scrapped by 2001 due to age.

Initial production sets (183-0 series) 

The initial production sets were manufactured between 1981 and 1983, resulting in 89 cars, which were divided into 4 types.  With the introduction of successor vehicles such as the KiHa 283 series and KiHa 261-1000 series, all vehicles were scrapped by 2018.

Later models

183-500 & 183-1500 series 

36 cars of what would become the 183-500 and 183–1500 series were manufactured in 1986 at Niigata Engineering Co., Ltd. and Fuji Heavy Industries, with the main purpose of improving the management base of JR Hokkaido. These cars were also known as the N183 series.

183-550 & 183-1550 series 

28 cars of what would become the 183-550 and 183-1550 series were manufactured by Fuji Heavy Industries between 1988 and 1990. Also known as the NN183 series, these cars would feature changes to the bathroom and interior from the N183 series cars. These cars would also see installation of a fresh air intake to ensure no engine smoke entered the cabin.

Resort trains (183-5000, 183-5100 and 183-5200 series) 
Due to the Sekishō Line opening in 1981 and the number of passengers to resort areas in the Central Hokkaido area increasing, a decision was made to modify the Alpha Continental 56 series train in 1985. After adding two services (the Furano Express and Tomamu-Sahoro Express) based on the 80 series trains, the design was changed to that of the 183 series.  In total, 3 sets (12 cars) were built, and the new sets began service, starting with the Niseko Express in 1989. This was followed by the Crystal Express Tomamu & Sahoro set in the same year and the North Rainbow Express set in 1992. The North Rainbow Express set originally consisted of three cars, but in December 1994, it was lengthened to five cars.

Due to age, the Crystal Express set was withdrawn from service on 30 November 2019, and was scrapped in May 2020.

In July 2022, JR Hokkaido announced that the North Rainbow Express set would be withdrawn from service in Q1 2023.

183-5000 series (Niseko Express) 

 KiHa 183-5000 (5001–5002)
 An ordinary driving car with a capacity of 48 people and equipped with a bathroom. Two cars of this type were built in 1988.
 KiHa 182-5000 (5001)
 An intermediate passenger car with a capacity of 56, equipped with a telephone room.

183-5100 series (Crystal Express Tomamu & Sahoro) 
 KiHa 183-5100 (5101–5102) An ordinary driving car equipped with an observation deck. It had eight observation seats, but due to risk mitigation measures caused by a 789 series train colliding with a level crossing in January 2010, the deck was closed off.

 KiHa 182-5100 (5101)
 An intermediate passenger car with a capacity of 56 people, equipped with a skylight.

 KiSaRoHa 182-5100 (5101)
 A double-deck car built in December 1990. It is not equipped with an engine.

 183-5200 series (North Rainbow Express) 
 KiHa 183-5200 (5201–5202)
 An ordinary driving car with a capacity of 47 people. KiHa 183-5201 was damaged in an accident in February 1997, and was substituted with the KiHa 183-1 car while repair works took place.

 KiHa 182-5200 (5201, 5251)
 An intermediate passenger car with a capacity of 60 people.

 KiSaHa 182-5200 (5201)
 A double deck passenger car with a capacity of 36 people, equipped with a buffet room on the first floor and private rooms on the second floor.

 183-1000 series (JR Kyushu) 
Four cars of what would be known as the 183-1000 series' were manufactured between 1988 and 1989, originally for services to the Holland Village located in Nagasaki. Due to the Tosu to Mojikō section of the Kagoshima Main Line experiencing high demand, a coupler was added to the front end to enable joint working with 485 series trains.

 KiHa 183-1000 (1001, 1002)
 Two cars were produced in 1988. They do not have an in-built power supply.

 KiHa 182-1000 (1001, 1002)
 An intermediate car; one (1001) was manufactured in 1988, and was equipped with a power supply as well as cafe and small rooms. Another car (1002) was manufactured in 1989 and came equipped with an engine as well as having an onboard children's play area.
 

 Special services 

 Asahiyama Zoo 
In 2007, several KiHa 183–0 series cars were renovated for use on the Asahiyama Zoo limited express service (which was named because of the zoo's popularity) from Sapporo to Asahikawa, which also made stops at Iwamizawa and Takikawa stations.

Designed by former zookeeper and children's book author Hiroshi Abe, the complete set consisted of the Polar Bear (KiHa 183–3), Wolf (KiHa 182–46), Lion (KiHa 182–47), Chimpanzee (KiHa 182–48), and Penguin (KiHa 183–4) cars, and the external livery consisted of drawn children and animals.

In addition to changes to the children's playroom in the Polar Bear car and the introduction of a nursing room in the Penguin car, each car was equipped with a seat that was shaped like an animal (known as a "hug-hug" chair), intended for photography. These were replaced with stuffed animals in some seats in 2013.

This set ran from 2007 (with a brief pause between April and July 2013 due to refurbishment works) to March 2018, when the set was scrapped. The Asahiyama Zoo service was transferred to 789 series trains, and was eventually integrated with Lilac'' services.

Preserved cars

183-214, 183-220 
The restoration of 183-214 was funded by crowdfunding, and after being restored to JNR colors, it eventually was placed in the Abira Roadside Station, alongside 183–220.

Whilst 183-214 is on public display, 183-220 is in storage.

183-5001 (Niseko Express) 
After having its restoration crowdfunded, it is now stored at the Arishima Memorial Hall.

See also 
 Joyful Train

References 

183
Rolling stock of Thailand
Passenger rail transport in Myanmar
Japanese National Railways
183
183
Train-related introductions in 1980
183